Torquay United Football Club is an English professional association football club based in Torquay, Devon.  This is a chronological list of all Torquay United seasons from 1899 up until the end of the 2020–21 season.

History
Torquay United Football Club was originally formed in 1899.  After first joining the East Devon League in 1900, the club then went on to join the Torquay & District League, becoming champions of that league in 1909.  Encouraged by Plymouth Argyle and Exeter City turning professional, the people of Torquay were eager for United to join forces with the town's two other prominent football teams, Babbacombe and Ellacombe, with a view to creating a third professional club within Devon.  Although Babbacombe rejected the idea of a merger, Torquay United and Ellacombe agreed to pool their resources and formed Torquay Town in 1910.  Town won the Devon Senior Cup in their first season and became champions of the Plymouth & District League the following year.  Despite a fierce rivalry existing between Torquay Town and Babbacombe, the two clubs were finally amalgamated in 1921 and the newly combined team reverted to the name of Torquay United and were admitted into the Western League.  After one season in the Western League, United joined the Southern League and, after becoming champions of the Western Section, were elected into the Football League at the expense of Aberdare Athletic in 1927.

Despite having to seek re-election to the Football League after their debut season, Torquay soon managed to establish a place in the Third Division South, although without ever finishing higher than 10th position in all the seasons leading up to World War II.  By the 1950s however, United had become a much more competitive side and narrowly missed out on promotion to the Second Division in 1957.  When the Football League underwent restructuring in 1958, a poor season for United saw them placed in the newly created Division Four. Nevertheless, the 1960s proved fruitful for Torquay United and they spent the majority of the decade in Division Three, again coming close to promotion to Division Two in 1968.

However, when Torquay were again relegated from Division Three in 1972, it heralded a period of mediocrity which culminated in the club requiring re-election to the Football League in both 1985 and 1986.  When automatic relegation into the Conference was introduced the following year, only a last minute equaliser against Crewe Alexandra on the final day of the season saved United from the drop.  Torquay finally lifted themselves out of the basement division in 1991 after beating Blackpool in the Division Four play-off final, only to be relegated again the following season.  After narrowly escaping relegation to the Conference in 1996, they were again contesting a play-off final in 1998, although this time they were beaten by Colchester United.  Just three years later, in 2001, Torquay once again escaped expulsion into non-League football by beating Barnet on the final day of the season.  By 2004, the club had bounced back again by achieving automatic promotion to the third tier of English football (now renamed League One) for the first time since 1966.  Again relegated after just one season, worse was to come when, after two seasons in League Two, Torquay were finally relegated to the Conference in 2007.  However, after just two years in the Conference, United secured a return to the Football League by beating Cambridge United in the 2009 Conference play-off final.  Torquay again came close to returning to League One in 2011 but were narrowly beaten by Stevenage in the League Two play-off Final.

Since their election to the Football League in 1927, Torquay United have completed 34 seasons in the third tier of English football, 42 seasons in the fourth, seven seasons in the fifth (below the professional League) and one season in the sixth (Conference/National League North).  This list details all of the seasons played by Torquay United in English football from 1899 up until the last completed season. The list details the club's achievements in all major competitions, and the top scorers for each season in all competitions.

Seasons

Key

Key to league record:
P – Played
W – Games won
D – Games drawn
L – Games lost
F – Goals for
A – Goals against
Pts – Points
Pos – Final position
↑ – Promoted
↓ – Relegated

Key to divisions:
Lge 1 – Football League One
Lge 2 – Football League Two
Div 3 – Football League Third Division
Div 3S – Football League Third Division South
Div 4 – Football League Fourth Division
Conf – Conference National
SLE – Southern League English Section
SLW – Southern League Western Section
WL – Western League
P&DL – Plymouth & District League
EDL – East Devon League
T&DL – Torquay & District League

Key to rounds:
F – Final
RU – Runners-up
SF – Semi-final
SFS – Southern semi-final
QFS – Southern quarter-final
R- – Round 
QR- – Qualifying Round
EPR – Extra Preliminary Round
~ – Did not enter

Division changes shown in bold.
Abandoned league competitions shown in italics.
Goalscorers shown in bold were division top scorers for that season.

Notes
A.  Torquay United played no competitive matches during their first season.
B.  East Devon League tables currently not traced.
C.  Withdrew from East Devon League due to lack of a suitable home ground.
D.  Torquay began the 1907–08 season in the East Devon League but later replaced the reserve side in the Torquay & District League after the EDL folded.
E.  Before the beginning of the 1910–11 season, Torquay United merged with Ellacombe to become Torquay Town.
F.  Withdrew from Devon Senior Cup after failing to agree First Round match terms with Babbacombe.
G.  Torquay Town refused entry to Devon Senior Cup after late application to Devon County Football Association.
H.  Before the beginning of the 1921–22 season, Torquay Town merged with Babbacombe to become Torquay United once more.
I.  From the beginning of the 1923–24, the Southern League English and Welsh sections were restructured into the Western and Eastern sections.
J.  Rejoined the Western League due to depleted Southern League fixture list.
K.  Beaten in the Southern League championship play-off final by Eastern Section champions Brighton & Hove Albion Reserves.
L.  Torquay United elected to the Football League at the expense of Aberdare Athletic.
M.  Despite finishing bottom of the Third Division South, Torquay were successfully re-elected to the Football League.
N.  Although Torquay had qualified for the Third Division South Cup Final, their opponents (either Queens Park Rangers or Port Vale) had yet to be decided. The final, which was scheduled for September 1939, was not played due to the outbreak of World War II and the tournament would never be contested again.Statto.com - English Division Three South Cup: Honours 
O.  Due to the outbreak of World War II in September 1939, the Football League was abandoned after Torquay had played just three matches.  This season's statistics are for reference only and do not count towards the official records.

P.  Despite the Football League and FA Cup being abandoned for the duration of World War II, several regional Wartime Leagues were organised, in which Torquay took part during the 1939–40 and 1945–46 seasons.  These matches do not count towards official records.
Q.  Although the FA Cup resumed in 1945, the Football League did not restart until 1946.
R.  As well as being the 1955–56 Third Division South's top goalscorer with 40 goals, Sammy Collins' 42 goals in all competitions remains a club record.Holgate, p.56
S.  At the end of the 1957–58 season, the Third Divisions North and South were amalgamated with teams in the top half of each division being placed in Division Three and those in the bottom going into Division Four.  Torquay's 21st position resulted in them taking their place in Division Four.
T.  For the first time since their debut Football League season, Torquay required re-election to remain in the League.Holgate, p.95
U.  For the second season in succession, Torquay had to rely upon re-election to remain in the Football League.
V.  Beaten in the Division Four play-off final by Swansea City.
W.  Defeated Blackpool in the Division Four play-off final.Holgate, p.104
X.  Due to the creation of the Premier League, the old Division Four was renamed Division Three from the beginning of the 1992–93 season.
Y.  Beaten in the Division Three play-off semi-finals by Preston North End.
Z.  Torquay were spared relegation from the Football League due to the unsuitability of Conference winner Stevenage Borough's ground.
AA.  Beaten in the Division Three play-off final by Colchester United.
AB.  As from the beginning of the 2004–05 season, Division Three and Four were renamed League One and Two.
AC.  Beaten in the Conference play-off semi-finals by Exeter City.
AD.  Defeated Cambridge United in the Conference play-off final.
AE.  Deducted 1 point for fielding an ineligible player.
AF.  Beaten in the League Two play-off final by Stevenage.
AG.  Beaten in the League Two play-off semi-final by Cheltenham Town.

References
General

Specific

External links

Seasons
 
Torquay United F.C.